Apensen is a municipality southwest of Hamburg (Germany). Apensen has a population of about 3,000, the area of 20.74 km² and belongs to the district Stade, Lower Saxony.

It belonged to the Prince-Archbishopric of Bremen. In 1648 the Prince-Archbishopric was transformed into the Duchy of Bremen, which was first ruled in personal union by the Swedish and from 1715 on by the Hanoverian Crown. In 1823 the Duchy was abolished and its territory became part of the Stade Region.

Apensen is also the seat of the Samtgemeinde ("collective municipality") Apensen.

Twin towns
Apensen is twinned with
  Kolbuszowa in Poland

References

Stade (district)